Djabal Basket Iconi is a semi-professional basketball team based in the city of Iconi in the Comoros. The team was founded in 1979 and are one of the most decorated teams in the country, having won five national and eight regional championships. Djabal is currently coached by Fakri Mohamed, one of the most important players in the country's history.

In October 2022, Djabal represented Comoros in the 2023 BAL qualification, losing two games to KPA and COSPN.

References 

Basketball teams established in 1979
Basketball teams in the Comoros
Road to BAL teams